The fifth season of One Tree Hill, an American television series, began on January 8, 2008 with a two-hour episode. This is the second season to air on The CW television network. Season five is set four years into the future from the season 4 finale, and after the main characters have graduated from college. 

Production for this season of One Tree Hill, along with production for all other American scripted television shows, was caught in the middle of a contract dispute between the Writers Guild of America, East (WGAE), Writers Guild of America, west (WGAw) and the Alliance of Motion Picture and Television Producers (AMPTP). The dispute led to a strike by the writers, which has caused a lack in episodes being produced. The season was to conclude in June 2008, after twenty-two episodes, but the season had been shortened to twelve episodes due to the 2007–2008 Writers Guild of America strike. With the strike resolved, the CW announced that six more episodes would be produced bringing the episode count to eighteen. The ratings in Season 5 took a dive by averaging 2.8 million viewers weekly.

Overview
Nearly 5 years have passed, and Tree Hill has been through some major changes. Karen has closed the cafe, and is  travelling the world with her daughter, Lily and boyfriend, Andy. Some of them achieved the goals they set for themselves back in high school: Lucas published his novel, and is now famous, Brooke became a famous fashion designer, and Haley became the teacher she always wanted to be. While others weren't so lucky, Peyton crashed and burned in Los Angeles, and Nathan saw his dream of pro basketball greatness vanish in an instant. To top the icing on the cake, Dan has been freed from prison and is seeking forgiveness.

Cast and characters

Regular
 Chad Michael Murray as Lucas Scott (18 episodes)
 James Lafferty as Nathan Scott (18 episodes)
 Hilarie Burton as Peyton Sawyer (18 episodes)
 Bethany Joy Galeotti as Haley James Scott (18 episodes)
 Sophia Bush as Brooke Davis (18 episodes)
 Paul Johansson as Dan Scott (11 episodes)
 Lee Norris as Mouth McFadden (15 episodes)
 Antwon Tanner as Antwon "Skills" Taylor (14 episodes)
 Jackson Brundage as James Lucas Scott (16 episodes)

Recurring
 Michaela McManus as Lindsey Strauss (15 episodes)
 Robbie Jones as Quentin Fields (12 episodes)
 Lisa Goldstein as Millicent Huxtable (11 episodes)
 Torrey DeVitto as Carrie (10 episodes)
 Daphne Zuniga as Victoria Davis (7 episodes)
 Kate Voegele as Mia Catalano (7 episodes)
Bradley Evans as Jerry (6 episodes)
 Joe Manganiello as Owen Morello (5 episodes)
Kelly Collins Lintz as Alice Day (5 episodes)
 Cullen Moss as Junk Moretti (5 episodes)
 Vaughn Wilson as Fergie Thompson (5 episodes) 
 Stephen Colletti as Chase Adams (2 episodes)
 Kieren Hutchison as Andy Hargrove (2 episodes)
Hailey Wist as Molly (2 episodes)
Mary Kate Englehardt as Lily Roe Scott (2 episodes)
 Bevin Prince as Bevin Mirskey (1 episode)
 Brett Claywell as Tim Smith (1 episode)
Shawn Shepard as Principal Turner (1 episode)

Special Guest Star
 Barbara Alyn Woods as Deb Lee (4 episodes)
 Danneel Harris as Rachel Gatina (2 episodes)
 Barry Corbin as Whitey Durham (1 episode)
 Moira Kelly as Karen Roe (1 episode)

Episodes

Production

On May 17, 2007, The CW announced that the show would return for a fifth season as a mid-season replacement. The show was dramatically retooled and set four years into the future - after the characters have already graduated from college. Until the show's return to the schedule, the network planned to post diaries online to fill in the intervening years in the characters' lives. The fifth season began shooting on July 30, 2007 and premiered January 8, 2008. Dawn Ostroff confirmed on July 20, 2007 that One Tree Hill had a 22-episode order.

Hilarie Burton confirmed on TRL that the show's fifth season would focus on their lives after college, citing the reason for this as "We've seen the high school dramas not do so well while they're in college, and another thing, we've done everything that everyone does in college". She said this will "enable them to do flashbacks and a lot of cool stuff with the characters".

Writers Strike
On November 5, 2007, a strike began between the Writers Guild of America, East (WGAE), Writers Guild of America, west (WGAw) and the Alliance of Motion Picture and Television Producers (AMPTP). The strike was speculated to force television shows to end their seasons early, because there would be no future scripts until a settlement was reached. Due to the writer's strike, only twelve out of the twenty-two episodes ordered were thought to be produced. With the end in sight, Mark Schwahn stated, "Although we have six new episodes left, no one is more excited about the end of the strike than we are at One Tree Hill." On the February 5, 2008 episode, One Tree Hill'''s ratings were second only to Smallville for scripted dramas at the CW. Schwahn went on to say that "we'd love the opportunity to continue season five, and if the WGA's new contract is ratified, hopefully we'll be able to do just that. If not, we'll see you for season six." On February 15, the CW announced that six additional episodes would be produced to wrap up the season due to the conclusion of the strike.

New and returning characters
For season five, Jackson Brundage was cast as James Scott, the child of Nathan and Haley Scott. Barry Corbin reprised his role as Whitey Durham for a flashback sequence. Danneel Harris returned, as a recurring not main cast member, to portray Rachel Gatina, who is now a drug addict. Moira Kelly also returned as Lucas' mother Karen Roe. Barbara Alyn Woods reprised her role of Deb Lee in the fourteenth episode, appearing in a total of four episodes.

Cullen Moss and Vaughn Wilson returned as Junk Moretti and Fergie Thompson, living with Mouth and Skills. Stephen Colletti reprised his guest role as Chase Adams, as did Kieren Hutchison as Andy Hargrove. Shawn Shepard returned to portray Tree Hill High's principal, Principal Turner, where Haley, Lucas and Skills now work. Brett Claywell returned as Tim Smith, working as a pizza boy. Bevin Prince also returned as Bevin Mirskey, married to Tim Smith, with whom she has a son, Nathan Smith.

Newcomer Michaela McManus was added to the cast for a multi-episode arc as Lindsey Strauss, a "tough but kind" New York editor assigned to work on Lucas' novel. Daphne Zuniga guest starred as a "glamorous and intimidating" business exec who works with Brooke, later revealed to be her mother. Torrey DeVitto has signed on to play the nanny of Nathan and Haley's son in a multi-episode arc. Robbie Jones joined the cast as Quentin Fields, a difficult student and member of the Ravens. Kelly Collins Lintz became a guest as Mouth's boss Alice. Lisa Goldstein was cast as Brooke's assistant as Millicent Huxtable. Kevin Federline appears in a multi-episode arc this season playing Jason, as well as singer/songwriter Kate Voegele who portrays Mia. Joe Manganiello has also been added as Owen, a bar tender at Tric. Mary Kate Englehardt returned to play the role of Lily Roe Scott.

One Tree Hill: Fast Forward
On November 6, 2007, The CW posted the first One Tree Hill online diary, a series of six segments to be released before the start of the new season. One Tree Hill Fast Forward allows fans of the show to catch a glimpse of the lives of the six main characters at the beginning of the fifth season. The first Fast Forward'' diary features Sophia Bush's character, Brooke Davis. The second diary, posted on November 13, featured Chad Michael Murray's character, Lucas Scott. The third diary, posted on November 20, featured Hilarie Burton's character, Peyton Sawyer. The fourth diary, posted on November 27, featured Lee Norris's character, Mouth McFadden.
The fifth diary, posted on December 4 featured the Scott family, consisting of Bethany Joy Galeotti's character, Haley James Scott and James Lafferty's character, Nathan Scott. The sixth and last diary, posted on December 11, featured all the new faces of the show, commented by Mark Schwahn, Joe Davola, the six main teens and the above listed new faces (minus Jamie).

Reception
The season opening to 3.36 million viewers and a 1.5 adults 18-49 rating. Episode two aired back-to-back with the season premiere and achieved season highs in viewers (3.57 m) and adults 18-49 (1.6). The season finale matched season highs in adults 18-49 with a 1.6 rating.

The season averaged 3.33 million viewers and a 1.2 Adults 18-49 rating in its original Tuesday 9/8C. After its move to Mondays at 9/8c, it averaged 2.78 million viewers and a 1.0 rating.

DVD release
The DVD release of season five was released after the season has completed broadcast on television. It has been released in Region 1. As well as every episode from the season, the DVD release features bonus material such as audio commentaries on some episodes from the creator and cast, deleted scenes, gag reels and behind-the-scenes featurettes.

References

External links
Official website

One Tree Hill (TV series) seasons
2008 American television seasons